"This Is Me" is a pop rock song performed by Demi Lovato and Joe Jonas in their vocal roles as Mitchie Torres and Shane Gray from the 2008 Disney Channel television film Camp Rock. It premiered on Radio Disney on June 6, 2008, and was released by Walt Disney Records onto the iTunes Store on June 17 as the fourth single from the Camp Rock soundtrack album. The song has versions and adaptations in eight languages ​​and an acoustic version included in different editions of the official soundtrack. A live version is also included on Jonas Brothers: The 3D Concert Experience. 

Written and produced by Adam Watts and Andy Dodd, "This Is Me" reached number 9 on the US Billboard Hot 100. The original version also reached the top 20 in Austria, Canada, Norway and Portugal. According to Nielsen SoundScan, the single has sold 945,000 digital copies to date in the United States.

Background 
"This Is Me" is the first song that Lovato's character, Mitchie Torres, sang in Camp Rock with Jonas's character, Shane Gray. Mitchie wrote the song in the beginning of the film, and was later heard (in an acoustic version on piano), but not seen, by Shane, who set out to search for the girl behind the amazing voice. After most people performed already in the "Final Jam" session, Mitchie sang the song (original version) and Shane saw her and sang part of the song he wrote, "Gotta Find You". The two songs are combined to make the original version, as featured on the Camp Rock soundtrack CD.

Lovato also recorded a Spanish version of the acoustic version of the song titled "Lo Que Soy", released on the deluxe edition of Don't Forget and as a video featuring her singing the song while playing the piano.

Lyrics and composition 
"This is Me" is a midtempo pop rock song with influences from power pop. The song is written in the key of A minor and Lovato's vocals span from G3 to E5. The lyrics discuss importance of one's personality and gives a positive message of following dreams and being yourself.

Release and promotion 
The song premiered on June 6, 2008 on Radio Disney, and the music video was first shown on June 12 on the Disney Channel. Three days before the premiere of the film, on June 17, the song was released onto the iTunes Store for digital purchase.

Before its premiere on Radio Disney, "This Is Me" was performed for the first time at the third annual Disney Channel Games in May. Lovato also performed with Beaker from The Muppets in Studio DC: Almost Live. The song was later part of the setlist for Demi Lovato: Live in Concert (2009-2010) and The Neon Lights Tour (2014). The Spanish version, "Lo Que Soy", was performed on the South American dates of the Jonas Brothers World Tour.

Commercial performance  
The song debuted at number eleven on the Billboard Hot 100 and eventually peaked at number nine, being their first top ten on the chart. It left the chart after seven weeks. The song also peaked at number 22 on the Pop 100, which ranked songs based on airplay on Mainstream Top 40 radio stations, singles sales and digital downloads. "This Is Me" reached the top 40 in ten countries, including the UK Singles Charts. It is Lovato's 18th biggest single in the UK as of 2022, according to the Official Charts.

As of 2017, "This Is Me" has sold 945,000 digital copies in the United States, according to Nielsen SoundScan, and 200,000 copies in the United Kingdom, where it was certified silver by the British Phonographic Industry (BPI).

Charts

Weekly charts

Year-end charts

Certifications and sales

Release history

Lo Que Soy

Background 
"Lo Que Soy" is the Spanish version of the song "This Is Me" of the soundtrack of the film Camp Rock. "Lo Que Soy" was included on the deluxe edition of Lovato's debut album Don't Forget (2008). The song includes the part of "Gotta Find You", but Joe Jonas does not sing. This version was performed on the South American dates of the Jonas Brothers World Tour.

Music video 
The music video features Lovato playing the piano and singing, while scenes from the movie appear. The music video was released to Disney Channel in Spain, Portugal and some countries of South America. It was directed by Edgar Romero.

Other versions 

 Disney Girlz Rock, Vol. 2 features the acoustic extended version, performed by Demi Lovato.
 Jonas Brothers: The 3D Concert Experience features a live version, performed by Demi Lovato and the Jonas Brothers.
 The European Bonus Track edition of the soundtrack features the acoustic version and a remix.
 The Indian edition features the version titled "Khush hu main", performed by Sunidhi Chauhan and Sangeet Haldipur.
 The Philippine edition features a version performed by Julianne and Miguel Escueta.
 The French edition features a version titled "Être Moi", performed by Sheryne.
 The Malaysian edition features a version titled "Siapaku", performed by Suki Low.
 The Polish edition features a version titled "Oto Ja", performed by Ewa Farna and Jakub Molęda.
 The Italian edition features a version titled "Sono io", performed by Ariel featuring her brother Stefano Centomo. A music video was released on August 29, 2008 on iTunes. The version was also included on Ariel's 2009 album Io ballo sola.
 Holly Hull performed the song as the prize for winning My Camp Rock, a show on Disney Channel UK where contestants competed to record a song from Camp Rock and an accompanying music video.
 Martina Stoessel performed "Lo Que Soy" during her audition for the Argentine Disney Channel telenovela Violetta.
 The third season of the Disney+ series High School Musical: The Musical: The Series features a version performed by Liamani Segura.

See also 
 List of Billboard Hot 100 top-ten singles in 2008

References 

2008 singles
Demi Lovato songs
Jonas Brothers songs
Joe Jonas songs
Pop ballads
Rock ballads
2000s ballads
Camp Rock
Walt Disney Records singles
Songs written by Adam Watts (musician)
2008 songs
Songs written by Andy Dodd
Male–female vocal duets